Menghuan Subdistrict is an urban subdistrict in Mangshi, Yunnan, China. It is the political, economic and cultural center of Mangshi City and Dehong Dai and Jingpo Autonomous Prefecture.

Administrative division
As of 2010, the subdistrict is divided into 11 communities: 
 Xinanli Community
 Dongbeili Community
 Tuanjie Community
 Xincun Community
 Jinhua Community
 Jianguo Community
 Bingwu Community
 Sankeshu Community
 Jiaolin Community
 Bingmen Community
 Chengxi Community

Etymology
In Dai language, "Mangshi" is called "Menghuan", which means "the city of dawn". It is said that Gautama Buddha came here just at dawn, so he named it.

History
In 2007, Menghuan Subdistrict separated from Mangshi Town.

Geography
Mangjiu Reservoir is a reservoir and the largest body of water in the subdistrict. It is very popular for boating, fishing and camping and is home to many residents from other areas of the province during the summer months.

Education
Dehong Vocational College is located in the subdistrict.

 Secondary school: Dehong No. 1 High School for Nationalities

Economy
The economy is supported primarily by commerce.

References

Divisions of Mangshi